Sara Maria Hector (born 4 September 1992) is a Swedish World Cup alpine ski racer. She has competed at seven World Championships and won three medals in the team event (2011, 2015, 2021).

Hector gained her first World Cup victory in December 2014, a giant slalom in Kühtai, Austria. At her third Winter Olympics in 2022, she was the gold medalist in giant slalom, was her first Olympic medal and the first Olympic gold for Sweden in the women's GS event in thirty years.

World Cup results

Season standings

Race podiums
 4 wins – (4 GS)
 13 podiums – (13 GS)

World Championship results

Olympic results

References

External links

1992 births
Living people
People from Sandviken Municipality
Swedish female alpine skiers
Alpine skiers at the 2014 Winter Olympics
Alpine skiers at the 2018 Winter Olympics
Alpine skiers at the 2022 Winter Olympics
Olympic alpine skiers of Sweden
Medalists at the 2022 Winter Olympics
Olympic medalists in alpine skiing
Olympic gold medalists for Sweden
Sportspeople from Gävleborg County